Charam, Iran is a city in Kohgiluyeh and Boyer-Ahmad Province, Iran

Charam in Iran may also refer to:
 Charam-e Kohneh, Razavi Khorasan Province
 Charam-e Now, Razavi Khorasan Province
 Charam County, in Kohgiluyeh and Boyer-Ahmad Province
 Charam Rural District, in Kohgiluyeh and Boyer-Ahmad Province